The 14th Cinema Express Awards were held on 30 April 1994, and honoured the best of South Indian films released in 1993. The awards were announced on 12 March 1994.

Tamil

Telugu

Kannada

Malayalam

NEPC Groups Awards

References 

1994 Indian film awards
Cinema Express Awards